Bazoques is a commune in the Eure department in northern France.

Population

Personalities
Louis-François de Livet, Marquis de Barville, was buried in Bazoques in 1789.

See also
Communes of the Eure department

References

External links

Monument to Marquis de Barville (French)

Communes of Eure